Miguel Francisco Gutiérrez Correa (27 July 1940 – 14 July 2016) was a Peruvian writer.

His works  on the theme of disaffected youth include El viejo saurio se retira (The Ancient Lizard Retires; 1969) and La violencia del tiempo (The Violence of Time; 1991).

Works
El viejo saurio se retira (1969)
Hombres de caminos (1988)
La violencia del tiempo (1991)
La destrucción del reino (1992)
Babel, el paraíso (1993)
Poderes secretos (1995)
El mundo sin Xóchitl (2001)
Cinco historias de mujeres y otra sobre Tamara Fiol (2006)
Confesiones de Tamara Fiol (2009)
Una pasión Latina (2011)

References

1940 births
2016 deaths
Peruvian male writers